Lycopodiella is a genus in the clubmoss family Lycopodiaceae. The genus members are commonly called bog clubmosses, describing their wetland habitat. The genus has a cosmopolitan distribution, with centers of diversity in the tropical New World and New Guinea. In the past, the genus was often incorporated within the related genus Lycopodium, but was segregated in 1964. In the Pteridophyte Phylogeny Group classification of 2016 (PPG I), Lycopodiella is placed in the subfamily Lycopodielloideae, along with three other genera. In this circumscription, the genus has about 15 species. Other sources use a wider circumscription, in which the genus is equivalent to the Lycopodielloideae of PPG I, in which case about 40 species and hybrids are accepted.

Description 
Lycopodiella are non-flowering plants. They have leafy rhizomes that grow along the ground and vertical, leafy shoots, also known as peduncles. Fertile peduncles have strobili at the top of the shoot. Individuals can have short, creeping rhizomes with simple strobili, branching rhizomes with many strobili, or anywhere in between. The North American specimens are typically shorter, have thinner shoots, and have fewer vertical shoots in the North than specimen in the South.

Life cycle 
Lycopodiella life cycles include an independent sporophyte stage and a long-lived gametophyte stage. Individuals reproduce by single-celled spores that disperse and germinate into small plants when in suitable conditions. This part of the plant is called the gametophyte; it produces the eggs and sperm. In Lycopodiella the gametophytes grow on the surface of the soil and are partially photosynthetic. After fertilization, the embryos grow into sporophytes, which are larger spore-bearing plants. The sporophyte is the vegetative part of the plant seen in nature. Juvenile individuals typically re-sprout in the spring or after a fire. Individuals have a base chromosome number of 78.

Taxonomy
In the Pteridophyte Phylogeny Group classification of 2016 (PPG I), Lycopodiella is placed in the subfamily Lycopodielloideae, along with three other genera (Lateristachys, Palhinhaea and Pseudolycopodiella). In 2022, an additional monotypic genus, Brownseya, was segregated from Pseudolycopodiella to render the latter monophyletic. Other sources do not recognize these genera, submerging them into Lycopodiella.

Extant species 

, the Checklist of Ferns and Lycophytes of the World recognized the following species:
Lycopodiella alopecuroides (L.) Cranfill – foxtail clubmoss; North and South America
Lycopodiella andicola B.Øllg. - northern Andes Mountains
Lycopodiella appressa (Chapm.) Cranfill – southern clubmoss, appressed bog clubmoss; eastern North America, Cuba
Lycopodiella duseniana (B.Øllg. & P.G.Windisch) B.Øllg. - Brazil
Lycopodiella geometra B.Øllg. & P.G.Windisch – southern South America
Lycopodiella inundata (L.) Holub – marsh clubmoss or bog clubmoss; circumboreal cool temperate
Lycopodiella longipes (Hook. & Grev.) Holub – Central and South America, Cuba
Lycopodiella margueriteae J.G.Bruce – northern prostrate clubmoss; central and eastern United States
Lycopodiella mathewsii (Hook.) Holub – northern South America
Lycopodiella prostrata (R.M.Harper) Cranfill – feather stem clubmoss; southeastern United States
Lycopodiella subappressa J.G.Bruce, W.H.Wagner & Beitel – northern appressed clubmoss; central and eastern United States
Lycopodiella tupiana (B.Øllg. & P.G.Windisch) B.Øllg. – southern South America

Some hybrids have also been described:
Lycopodiella × brucei Cranfill
Lycopodiella × copelandii (Eiger) Cranfill
Lycopodiella × gilmanii A.Haines
Lycopodiella × robusta (R.J.Eaton) A.Haines

Distribution and habitat 
Lycopodiella is found worldwide, but typically in temperate and tropical areas, a majority of which are found in North and South America. Individuals are typically found in terrestrial lowlands or montane forests on poor soils. Much of the soils are sandy and saturated and have little to no organic layer.

North America 
The known Lycopodiella in North America consists of six species and four hybrids. All but one species of Lycopodiella, Lycopodiella inundata, are limited to the East coast, Gulf of Mexico, and/or Great Lakes region. L. inundata is found from New England to Alaska and down into California.

References

External links 

 Genus description

Lycopodiaceae
Lycophyte genera